Don Fanucci is a fictional character appearing in Mario Puzo's 1969 novel The Godfather and the 1974 film The Godfather Part II, a sequel to the 1972 film version of Puzo's novel. Fanucci is portrayed by Gastone Moschin and is based on the personality of Ignazio Lupo, a real-life Black Hand figure.

In the original novel and The Godfather Part II
Fanucci is a notorious Black Hand extortionist in Little Italy who supports himself by demanding and collecting protection money from neighborhood businesses. Vito Corleone (Robert De Niro) witnesses Fanucci threatening to disfigure a young girl when her father refuses to pay him and is about to intervene when he is stopped by his friend, Genco Abbandando, who tells him who Fanucci really is. Vito also loses his job as a grocery clerk when Fanucci strong-arms Genco's father into employing his nephew.

In the novel and in The Godfather Saga, the film adaptation re-edited for television, Vito witnesses an attack on Fanucci by two young men who are tired of Fanucci's oppression over the neighborhood. Although Fanucci screams for help, nobody comes to his rescue and the two youths rob him, slash his throat, and leave him for dead. Vito knows from his own experiences that a real Don would never travel anywhere without bodyguards, nor would anyone dare to attack him in public for fear of retaliation. Vito begins to suspect that Fanucci's power comes from the threat of force rather than force itself.

One day, while Vito is driving a load of stolen merchandise, Fanucci suddenly jumps onto the moving vehicle. He explains how he knows that Vito, Peter Clemenza (Bruno Kirby), and Sal Tessio (John Aprea) have committed several robberies and are now trying to fence the stolen goods. He demands a cut of $200 each from the three men; however, he states that he is willing to take less if his estimations of the cargo's value are wrong, and says he will report Vito to the police if his demands are not met. This confirms Vito's suspicions that Fanucci is not as powerful as he claims, since a real Don would not get the police involved in his business unless he had no other way to enforce his will.

Vito assures Fanucci that he will convince his friends to pay him. That night, Vito meets with Clemenza and Tessio over dinner and expresses hesitations about paying Fanucci. They both tell Vito that they must pay, and when Vito mentions that he knows two bookies across town who don't pay Fanucci anything, Tessio and Clemenza insist that someone else must collect from them for Fanucci's boss, the powerful and feared Black Hand leader Maranzalla, who is the true power behind the Don. Vito meets with Fanucci but offers only $100. Impressed with the young man's courage, Fanucci tells Vito he will find him work in his organization for good money. Vito is now convinced Fanucci is all talk.

After the meeting, Vito follows Fanucci through the Feast of Saint Rocco and then, via the rooftops, to his apartment down the street. Letting himself in through a rooftop doorway, he descends to Fanucci's apartment and partially unscrews a lightbulb to hide his presence. When Fanucci arrives and fixes the bulb, Vito shoots him three times, the sounds of gunfire masked by the carnival outside and by a rolled-up towel Vito uses as a makeshift silencer. After completing the hit, Vito retrieves the money that Fanucci had taken earlier, smashes the gun into pieces, dumps them down several chimneys on the rooftop of Fanucci's apartment building, and returns unnoticed to the Feast.

Because the hit was carried out on Vito's own initiative and because he was the only one of the three not cowed by Fanucci, Vito moves from being equal partners with Tessio and Clemenza to being the uncontested boss of their operation. Vito, with Clemenza and Tessio as his lieutenants and Genco Abbandando as his consigliere, gradually takes over the neighborhood and opens a legitimate business, Genco Olive Oil Company (named after Abbandando), to serve as a front for their illegal dealings. Because Vito treats the residents with a great deal more respect than Fanucci had, he soon earns the neighborhood's loyalty. Since Fanucci was not well-liked by the police, his murder is not properly investigated and is eventually written off as an assassination committed by a rival gangster. Owing to his clean record, Vito is never suspected, though the common knowledge that he is responsible for Fanucci's death increases his reputation for toughness when it is needed.

Unbeknownst to Vito, his young son Sonny witnesses his father on the rooftop of Fanucci's apartment seconds after the Don's murder. Vito later learns this after Sonny reveals it to him at age 16 after being nearly caught by the police for armed robbery. It is this revelation that results in Sonny becoming a formal member of the Corleone crime family. This is not mentioned in the film, however.

Influences
Fanucci is primarily based on Ignazio Lupo, a real-life Black Hand practitioner and member of the Morello crime family; his boss Maranzalla is likely a reference to Giuseppe Morello, a prominent figure in the early days of the New York Mafia. Another possible inspiration for Fanucci is Giosuè Gallucci, an Italian-American political and crime boss who, like Fanucci, was known to wear expensive suits while collecting money extorted from businesses and civilians in New York's Italian quarter, and who was also murdered in a shooting committed by rival gangsters.

References

External links
Profile on imdb.com

The Godfather characters
Characters in American novels of the 20th century
Fictional characters based on real people
Fictional characters from Manhattan
Literary characters introduced in 1969
Fictional immigrants to the United States
Fictional Sicilian people
Male literary villains
Male film villains
Cultural depictions of the Mafia
Fictional murdered people
Fictional crime bosses
Film characters introduced in 1974